It Heidenskip is a village in Súdwest-Fryslân in the province of Friesland, the Netherlands. It had a population of around 335 in January 2017.

History
The village was first mentioned in 1511 as Heijdenscip, and means "wild growth on land". It Heidenskip is a long linear settlement. It is a relative new settlement. In 1851, it contained two buildings and a ferry. The name used for the area between the city of Workum and the  lake. During the 19th century, a settlement developed in Brandeburen.

The oldest church dated from 1389, but was demolished and a farm was built in its place. In the 19th century, a small Mennonite church was built, which resulted in the construction of a Dutch Reformed church. In 1979, it was elevated to the status of village. Before 2011, the village was part of the Nijefurd municipality. Before 1984 it partly belonged to Hemelumer Oldeferd and partly to Workum.

Gallery

References

External links

Súdwest-Fryslân
Populated places in Friesland